The 1915–16 season was the 27th season in existence for Sheffield United.  Following the outbreak of World War I the English Football League and cup competitions were suspended, instead the team played in two regional competitions competing in the Midland section.  With players away on active service or engaged in the war effort the first team squad was augmented by a series of guest players.  These players were usually local born footballers who were home on leave from the army or had returned to the city to take up their former professions.  Some were former Blades players whilst others would go on to sign for the club after the end of the war.

At this time the club did not employ a manager, with the team being selected by the Football Committee although the club secretary, John Nicholson, undertook many of the duties now associated with a team manager.

Players

Squad

Wartime guest players

Transfers

Out

Squad statistics

|-
|colspan="10"|Guest players:

|}

League tables

Midland Section

Midland Division (subsidiary competition)

Matches

Midland Section

Midland Division (subsidiary competition)

Friendlies

References

Sheffield United
Sheffield United F.C. seasons